PHILSOC or variation, may refer to:

 Philological Society (founded 1842, aka London Philological Society), a British charity and academic society dedicated to the study of language
 2019 Philippine Southeast Asian Games Organizing Committee, for the 2019 Southeast Asian Games
 2005 Philippine SEA Games Organising Committee, for the Manila 2005 Southeast Asian Games
 UCD Philosophy Society (founded 1965), at University College Dublin, in Dublin, Ireland

See also

 
 
 phil (disambiguation)
 SOC (disambiguation)